Mah Meri may refer to:
Mah Meri people
Mah Meri language